.fr is the Internet country code top-level domain (ccTLD) in the Domain Name System of the Internet for France. It is administered by AFNIC. The domain includes all individuals and organizations registered at the Association française pour le nommage Internet en coopération (AFNIC).

Since 2004, websites registered with the .fr domain are archived and preserved by the Bibliothèque nationale de France.

Requirements
In order to purchase and use a .fr domain, they must be a resident of the European Union or an EFTA member state (Switzerland, Norway, Iceland or Liechtenstein).

British restrictions
Due to the United Kingdom's withdrawal from the European Union, since 1 January  2021 UK residents are not able to register new .fr domains. However, the AFNIC has stated that all domains registered before 31 December 2020 by Britons will not be affected.

Other domains under French administration
 .bl: CC TLD for Saint Barthélemy
 .gf: CC TLD for French Guiana
 .gp: CC TLD for Guadeloupe
 .mf: CC TLD for Saint Martin
 .mq: CC TLD for Martinique
 .nc: CC TLD for New Caledonia
 .pf: CC TLD for French Polynesia
 .pm: CC TLD for Saint Pierre and Miquelon
 .re: CC TLD for Réunion
 .yt: CC TLD for Mayotte

See also
Internet in France
.eu: CC TLD for the European Union
.paris

References

External links
IANA .fr whois information
AFNIC
Finding a Registrar
Charte de nommage des extensions françaises,

1986 establishments in France
Internet properties established in 1986
Country code top-level domains
Internet in France
Computer-related introductions in 1986
Council of European National Top Level Domain Registries members

he:סיומת אינטרנט#טבלת סיומות המדינות
sv:Toppdomän#F